The Cowdrey House is a historic house at 1 Valley Street in Yellville, Arkansas.  It is a -story wood-frame structure, with asymmetrical massing and a pyramidally-roofed turret typical of the Queen Anne style.  Built in 1904, the house is particularly notable for its interior woodwork, which was made in Memphis, Tennessee and transported to Yellville for installation.  It was built by J. S. Cowdrey, whose family were early settlers of the area and were involved in many local businesses.  The Cowdreys hosted future President of the United States Herbert Hoover in 1927.

The house was listed on the National Register of Historic Places in 1978.

See also
National Register of Historic Places listings in Marion County, Arkansas

References

Houses on the National Register of Historic Places in Arkansas
Victorian architecture in Arkansas
Houses completed in 1902
Houses in Marion County, Arkansas
National Register of Historic Places in Marion County, Arkansas
1902 establishments in Arkansas
Queen Anne architecture in Arkansas
Yellville, Arkansas